Pandwala Kalan, officially the Pindwala Kalan (Pindwala Kalan) is a village in South West Delhi. It is the one of the largest villages by area, the tenth most popular village (with over 3,779 people) in the Najafgarh Tehsil of South-West Delhi. It is bounded by the Daulatpur, Hasan Pur villages on the south, the Ujawa on the southwest, and the Pandwala Khurd on the southeast. It shares land borders with Shri Hans Nagar and Khera Dabar to the west; Paprawat to the northeast; and Pandwala Khurd to the east. 

Etymology
The name Pandwala Kalan is derived from Paṇḍ (पण्ड्), which means "to collect, heap, pile up", and this root is used in the sense of knowledge.[5] The term is found in Vedic and post-Vedic texts, but without any sociological context. In the colonial era literature, the term generally refers to Brahmins specialized in Hindu law.[6] Aala (आला), which means the supreme leader of the organization. 

The latter term stems from the Kalan (Hindustani: कलाँ, Punjabi: ਕਲਾਂ) are administrative designations used in India and Pakistan to indicate the smaller (Khurd) and larger (Kalan) segments of a town, village or settlement. 

The geographical term Pandwala Kalan, which is recognized by the Constitution of India as an official name for the village is used by many in its variations. Scholars believe it to be named after the Vedic tribe in the second millennium B.C.E. It is also traditionally associated with the Droņa (Sanskrit: द्रोण, Droņa) or Droņacharya or Guru Droņa, the royal preceptor to the Kauravas and Pandavas and incarnation of Brahma; an avatar of Brihaspati. He was the son of rishi Bharadwaja and a descendant of the sage Angirasa. He was a master of advanced military arts, including the divine weapons or Astras.

History

Pandwala has an ancient history since Mahabharata era when Drona decides to continue Parashurama's legacy by starting his own school. He uproots his family and begins wandering Northern India. While at Hastinapur, he comes across the Kuru princes at play, and is able to use his abilities to help the princes solve some of their problems. Amazed, the princes go to their patriarch Bhisma with news of this magician.
Bhishma instantly realized that this was Drona, and asked him to become the Guru of the Kuru princes, training them in advanced military arts.[6] It is believed that the city of Gurgaon (literally - "Village of the Guru") was founded as "Guru Gram" by Dronacharya on land given to him by Dhritarashtra, the king of Hastinapura in recognition of his teachings of martial arts to the princes, and the 'Dronacharya Tank', still exists within the Gurgaon city, along with a village called Gurgaon.[14] Pandwala is one of the places in Gurgaon where Dharma was taught to the Kauravas and Pandavas.

The village is about 15 km away from Indira Gandhi International Airport, and 2 km away from Chaudhary Brahm Prakash Ayurved Charak Sansthan, which is Asia's largest Ayurvedic hospital.
It is declared as R-Zone officially by Delhi government.
It has a green environment with a few temples with great history. The main and famous temple of the village is Ramtal mandir and it is the only village in Najafgarh district in which the tubewell water can be used for drinking purpose while in all other villages of Najafgarh groundwater is not suitable for drinking.

In coming years we may see a different village which would be occupied by the higher buildings.

 The village has its own post office, Meetha kuan is oldest well in this village. There are two temples in the village: Hanuman temple and Shiva temple. Hanuman temple is the oldest one.

Pandwala Kalan has its own primary school, a dispensary with good facilities, and Sr. Sec. School Chatarpati Shivaji. 

Sushil International School managed by wrestler Sushil Kumar foundation is situated next to Shri Hans Nagar Colony on main Najafgarh–Darulla road on land of Pandwala Kalan.
Mela is organised in the Ramtal mandir every year on the last two days of navratris and a bhandara (feast) on 30th January of every year.
There are two gotras of Yadav's in this village. They are 'Aafariyas' and 'Gothwals'. There are Brahmins in the village as well. There are also two gotras of Brahmins: Vats and Bhardwaj.

Pandwala kalan shares borders with Paprawat ; Hasanpur ; Pandwala khurd ; Kharkhari Nahar and Kharkhari Jamat

Pandwala Kalan is also a part of Daulatpur Khap Panchayat( A Group of 9 Nearby Villages) and Surhera Khap panchayat (A group of 17 nearby Villages)

It is almost 1.5 kilometers away from Jhatikra road which connects this village to Najafgarh, a semi-urban developing city. The fields of this area are covered by greenery and a very hygienic natural atmosphere. Recently a high voltage electricity line is constructed over this village passing through the fields and connecting a major power station of this area placed at village ghummanhera. One more main road connects pandwala kalan to najafgarh that is galibpur road passing through the khaira village. The village has two government borewells which provide drinking water to all village. Other than these two borewells a new underground water supply has been started from village Daulatpur to Pandwala Kalan which sends water almost all the day.

D.T.C bus route no- 819, 833,719; other buses are 828, 887, 818, 845, 829, 898

Villages in South West Delhi district